Eastward may refer to:

The cardinal direction East
Eastward (Montclair, New Jersey), US, a historic building
Eastward (album), by Gary Peacock, 1970
"Eastward" (song), by Lazarus, 1971; covered by the Lettermen, 1974
Eastward (video game), a 2021 video game

See also
Eastward Hoe, an early Jacobean stage play